The riverine rabbit (Bunolagus monticularis), also known as the bushman rabbit or bushman hare, is a rabbit with an extremely limited distribution area, found only in the central and southern regions of the Karoo Desert of South Africa's Northern Cape Province. It is the only member of the genus Bunolagus because of unique traits that separate it from the other leporids. It is one of the most endangered mammals in the world, with only around 500 living adults, and 1500 overall.

They have a diet which consists of mostly plants and vegetation, but their usual food sources are being diminished, causing a scarcity for their population. This food loss is also connected to other problems such as with forming burrows. A unique aspect of its biology is that females can only produce one offspring per year. This contributes to how it is classified as critically endangered, which is the most severe classification available. Other unique traits include being nocturnal, and producing two different types of droppings. Currently, there are conservation plans being enacted to help with its decreasing population and habitat.

Identification
The riverine rabbit is native to the Karoo desert in South Africa. It has a general appearance that is similar to most rabbits, but the ears and body are longer. It typically has a black stripe running from the corner of the mouth over the cheek, and a white ring around each eye. It also has a brown woolly tail, cream or greyish-coloured fur on its belly and throat, and a broad, club-like hind foot. It has a dental formula of 2/1, 0/0, 3/2, 3/3, like other rabbits, with a total of 28 teeth. Its tail is pale brown with a tinge of black toward the tip. Its coat is soft and silky and its limb are short and heavily furred. Male riverine rabbits weigh approximately 1.5 kilogram while females weigh about 1.8 kilograms.

Taxonomy 
The riverine rabbit's scientific name is Bunolagus monticularis. Some common names referring to it are the bushman hare and the bushman rabbit. These names arose from the habitats they lived in and are based on how these were moist and dense. Genetically, its closest relations are to the Amami rabbit, the Hispid hare, and the European rabbit.

Habitat
It is found in only a few places in the Karoo Desert of South Africa's Northern Cape province. Sanbona Wildlife reserve is classified as a protected wilderness area, which has a successful breeding population, where it is being researched and monitored. As its name suggests, the Riverine rabbit prefers to occupy river basins and very particular shrubland. It feeds on the dense shrubland and the soft soil allows for it to create vast burrows and dens for protection, brooding young, and thermoregulation. The riverine rabbit lives in very dense growth along the seasonal rivers in the central semi-arid Karoo region of South Africa. Its habitat regions are tropical and terrestrial while its terrestrial biomes are desert or dune and scrub forest. Two of the most common plants in its habitat are Salsola glabrescens (11·8%) and Lycium spp. (8·5%).

They appear and live specifically in riverine vegetation on alluvial soils adjacent to seasonal rivers, though studies have found this habitat to be sixty-seven percent fragmented in certain areas. Currently the habitat is decreasing in size, contributing to this species being classified as endangered. The primary reason for the decline in habitats is due to cultivation and livestock farming. Major threats to this species comes from loss and degradation of habitat. Over the last hundred years, over two-thirds of their habitat has been lost. Today only five hundred mature riverine rabbits are estimated to be living in the wild. Removal of the natural vegetation along the rivers and streams prevent the rabbits from being able to construct stable breeding burrows. This is because of the loss of the soft alluvial top soils, which are necessary for the construction of these. Another cause of damage and loss to their habitats comes from overgrazing of domestic herbivores, which also causes degradation and fragmentation of the land. Without suitable habitat they have a lower rate of survival.

The remaining habitat is thought to only be able to support 1,435 rabbits. This displays a main cause for its endangerment, which is that there is very little habitat left that can support it.

Predators and competitors 

The riverine rabbit is hunted by falconiformes and black eagles. However, it is capable of jumping over one meter high bushes when being pursued by a predator. To escape predation, it remains nocturnal, spending the day resting in a form, which is a shallow scrape made in the soil under a Karoo bush.

Diet 

The riverine rabbit is predominantly known for being a “browser”. They eat riparian vegetation found along seasonal rivers in the Karoo Desert. This includes salt-loving plants such as the salsola and lycium. They sometimes eat grass depending on if it is the wet season. Aside from their conventional food intake, they also consume their day-time droppings which are soft and come directly from the anus. This is advantageous because their feces contains vitamin produced by the bacteria in the hindgut and also contains minerals such as calcium and phosphorus.

Behaviour
Riverine rabbits are solitary and nocturnal. They feed on their preferred foods, flowers, grasses, leaves at night. During the day they rest in forms. It produces two types of droppings. While active during the night the rabbit will produce hard droppings, and during the day droppings are soft, taken directly from the anus, and swallowed. In this way the riverine rabbit obtains vitamin B, produced by bacteria in the hind gut, and minerals such as calcium and phosphorus are recycled.

They are polygamous, but they live and browse for food alone. They have intra-sexually exclusive home ranges; the males’ home ranges overlap slightly with those of the various females. Between August and May, females will make a nest in a burrow lined with grass and fur, and blocked with soil and twigs. This nest is 10–15 cm in diameter, 25 cm long.

Reproduction
The riverine rabbit is one of the rarest mammals in the world and very little is known about its reproductive behavior other than that it has a polygamous mating system, where males mate with more than one female. It bears its young underground for protection. The single offspring that the rabbit produces is born altricial, or bald, blind, and helpless, and weighs from 40 to 50 grams. It is the only African rabbit that bears its young underground. The helpless offspring stays with the mother until it is capable of living on its own and fending for itself. The low breeding rate of only one offspring per year is unlike most other rabbits and has led to attempts to increase numbers of this endangered species. A breeding colony has been established at the De Wildt Cheetah and Wildlife Centre near Pretoria. These rabbits will mate with a number of individuals, and are the only known rabbit species to make nests for the baby. Very rarely, two kits may be born at once.

Relationship with humans 
The riverine rabbit provides many benefits for farmers. It causes the riverine vegetation that it eats to bind to the soil and prevent it from being washed away in floods. Also, this vegetation promotes filtration of rainwater to groundwater, which is a benefit to farmers, who often use windmills to draw up water for their livestock. Indirectly, the habitat of riverine rabbit helps humans in farming. This benefit can only be sustained if the rabbit continues to feed on this vegetation.

Endangerment

Extent 
The riverine rabbit is a species that is in extreme danger of extinction. In 1981 it was first labeled as an endangered species. According to the IUCN Redlist It is now classified under the most severe category of endangerment (aside from extinction), which is critically endangered. It has a population of only about 500 mature rabbits and 1500 overall which both continue to decline. In addition, the IUCN Redlist predicts increased population reduction, in the immediate future. Their exact prediction is for one tenth of the population to be lost between 2002 and 2022. Another problem that this species faces in terms of population is how their already immensely small population is divided into several isolated groups, about 10 in total, all with less than 50 rabbits in each.

Causes 
The decline in the population is largely due to the alteration of its habitat as over half of it has been rendered unable to support the rabbit since 1970. The reason for this is largely due to the use of land for agriculture, causing the unique needed environment of the riverine rabbit to be destroyed. The range of habitable area continues to decline, and it is predicted that over the next 100 years that another fifth of habitable area will be lost. The reason for this ongoing destruction of the rabbit’s habitat is the practice of raising animals for commercial reasons in the area, causing the environment to be transformed to serve this end. Another ongoing threat to the rabbit is how the isolated groups are divided up because fields in the area often have fencing which is impermeable to this species, designed to keep out jackals. An additional threat to the species is found in how the remaining land left that supports it is being damaged by climate change. Other sources for population reduction are found in how the rabbit is hunted for entertainment, food, and collection, and also in how the rabbit has often fallen into traps set on farms, for the purpose of capturing other bothersome animals. Soil erosion in the area of habitation is another factor in destroying the animal. Animals feeding on local vegetation decimates the already narrow scope of food for the rabbit. The practice of extracting materials from trees and destroying local vegetation destroys areas that the rabbits conventionally use to escape the heat, and also hide from animals which seek to eat or harm them. Finally, structures on rivers like dams isolate subpopulations from each other, discouraging faster population regeneration.

Conservation

Current efforts 
Relatively speaking to other similar species, there is little information known about key aspects of the riverine rabbit, such as behavior and diet, so one of the most meaningful conservation efforts underway is researching this species, seeking to find critical information about the species that will lead to more effective conservation measures. The current plan to protect the remaining members of the population has been criticized, with experts claiming that a large part of the remaining land that can support the rabbit is outside the current area being preserved for it. Other efforts include engaging and educating local farmers so that they act in a way which reduces harm to the species. Also, efforts have been carried out to get landowners of the area of the habitat to agree to certain measures that help the rabbit population. One of the most important and meaningful conservation efforts has been to engage in highly thorough monitoring of rabbit populations, a task made more difficult by the emergence of a new population in 2014. This endeavor has been carried out largely by the Endangered Wildlife Trust.

Recommended action 
The IUCN recommends several further conservation measures, demonstrating that current actions are not adequate. They recommend capturing the animal as to safely allow it to reproduce without danger of predators or of not being able to find food. They also recommend different methods of managing the habitat and the population in the wild. Finally they recommend further efforts of informing the local populace as to how to protect the rabbit. The red list also notes that further research is needed into its ecology and into the conservation actions that would be most effective.

References

Bibliography 
“Animal Info - Riverine Rabbit.” Animal Info/ Endangered Animals, www.animalinfo.org/species/bunomont.htm.
Awaad, Rania. “Bunolagus Monticularis (Riverine Rabbit).” Animal Diversity Web, animaldiversity.org/accounts/Bunolagus_monticularis/.
Bunolagus Monticularis (Riverine Rabbit), www.biodiversityexplorer.org/mammals/lagomorpha/bunolagus_monticularis.htm.
Collins; et al. (2003). "Bunolagus monticularis". IUCN Red List of Threatened Species. Version 2006. International Union for Conservation of Nature. Retrieved 2006-05-11.

“EDGE :: Mammal Species Information.” EDGE of Existence, www.edgeofexistence.org/mammals/species_info.php?id=3.
Hoffman, R.S.; Smith, A.T. (2005). "Order Lagomorpha". In Wilson, D.E.; Reeder, D.M. Mammal Species of the World: A Taxonomic and Geographic Reference (3rd ed.). Johns Hopkins University Press. p. 194. . 
Macdonald, D (2001). The New Encyclopedia of Mammals. Oxford University Press. 
Platt, John R. “New Population of Critically Endangered Rabbits Found in (of All Places) a Nature Reserve.” Scientific American Blog Network, 7 Jan. 2014, blogs.scientificamerican.com/extinction-countdown/new-population-of-critically-endangered-rabbits-found-in-of-all-places-a-nature-reserve/.
“Riverine Rabbit.” Accommodation South Africa - SA-Venues.com, www.sa-venues.com/wildlife/wildlife_riverine_rabbit.htm.
“Riverine Rabbit - Bunolagus Monticularis - Overview.” Encyclopedia of Life, Smithsonian Institution's National Museum of Natural History, www.eol.org/pages/311977/overview.
“Riverine Rabbit, Bushman Rabbit, Bushman Hare.” Bunolagus Monticularis : WAZA : World Association of Zoos and Aquariums, WAZA, www.waza.org/en/zoo/visit-the-zoo/rodents-and-hares/bunolagus-monticularis.
Starzak, Kelly. “In South Africa, Rare Riverine Rabbits Are Ready for Their Closeup.” Earth Touch News Network, Earth Touch, 23 Feb. 2015, www.earthtouchnews.com/conservation/endangered/in-south-africa-rare-riverine-rabbits-are-ready-for-their-closeup/.
Wilson, Don E. “Bunolagus Monticularis.” ITIS Standard Report - Error, Smithsonian Institution Press, 2005, itis.gov/servlet/SingleRpt/SingleRpt?search_topic=TSN.
Wyk, Cronje van, et al. “Riverine Rabbit - Characteristics, Habitat & Breeding - Critically Endangered Species.” Its Nature Offers You Interesting Information and Facts on the Natural World, www.itsnature.org/endangered/riverine-rabbit/.

External links
Bunolagus monticularis at animalinfo.org
World's most endangered mammals at animalinfo.org
Images and movies of the riverine rabbit (Bunolagus monticularis) at ARKive

Endemic fauna of South Africa
Leporidae
EDGE species
Critically endangered fauna of Africa
Karoo
Mammals of South Africa
Mammals described in 1903
Taxa named by Oldfield Thomas